Phyllocnistis valentinensis is a moth of the family Gracillariidae. It is known from Spain, Greece and Bulgaria.

The larvae feed on Salix alba and Salix triandra. They mine the leaves of their host plant. The mine consists of a lower-surface, epidermal gallery with a very narrow central frass line. The gallery remains within the blade of a single leaf. The gallery ends upon the leaf margin, that folds somewhat downwards. Here, pupation takes place.

References

Phyllocnistis
Moths of Europe